Xiaoxiang refers to the "lakes and rivers" region in south-central China, corresponding roughly to Hunan province.

Xiaoxiang may also refer to:

 Xiaoxiang poetry, Chinese poetic genre
 Xiaoxiang Range (小相岭), mountain range in Sichuan Province, China
  (小湘镇), town in Gaoyao District, Guangdong, China
  (潇湘水库), reservoir in Qilin District, Qujing, Yunnan province, China
  (小庠岛), island in Pingtan County, Fujian province, China